Taylor Farm is a historic farm complex located in Richmond, Virginia. The complex consists of a well-preserved group of buildings and landscape elements ranging in date from the 1870s to the 1930s. they include a small two-story frame main house, a handsome American Craftsman-style garage, a storage shed, a barn, a corncrib, a lumber shed, and a poultry house.

It was added to the National Register of Historic Places in 1991.

References

Farms on the National Register of Historic Places in Virginia
Buildings and structures completed in 1870
Buildings and structures in Richmond, Virginia
National Register of Historic Places in Richmond, Virginia